"Fireproof" is a 2016 song by Canadian singer Coleman Hell, released on April 29, 2016. It was a commercial success in both Canada and the United States.

Charts

Weekly charts

Year-end charts

References

2016 songs
2016 singles
Coleman Hell songs
Columbia Records singles